Aulhausen was first mentioned in 1108 as Aulhausen im Rheingau. It lies in Hessen and has about 1200 Inhabitants (2018). From 1970 to 1977 Aulhausen was a district in Assmannshausen. The wine and air recreation town lies in a valley above Assmannshausen. It is separated from Rüdesheim by Niederwald.

Aulhausen as well as Assmannshausen are today part of the municipality of Rüdesheim am Rhein. 100 years before the foundation of Marienhausen craftsmen started building this hamlet. The Agriculture and the wine growing dominated the town character from the end of the 19th to the middle of the 20th. Today the biggest employer in Aulhausen is St. Vincenzstift.

The St. Vincenzstift is a widely known facility. St. Vincenzstift work with care and support of disabled children.

References

Rheingau-Taunus-Kreis
Villages in Hesse
Rheingau